The Floyd Jackson House is a historic house on Jackson Street in Hardy, Arkansas.  It is a single story fieldstone structure, built in 1929.  Its architecturally distinctive features include a gable roof with extended eaves and exposed rafter tails, with colored wood shingles decorating the gable ends.  The interior of the house retains original pine woodwork.  It is an example of American craftsman/Bungalow style.

The house was listed on the National Register of Historic Places in 1998.

See also
National Register of Historic Places listings in Sharp County, Arkansas

References

Houses on the National Register of Historic Places in Arkansas
Houses completed in 1929
Houses in Sharp County, Arkansas
National Register of Historic Places in Sharp County, Arkansas